The 1996 Ondrej Nepela Memorial was the 4th edition of an annual senior-level international figure skating competition held in Bratislava, Slovakia. It took place between September 27 and 30, 1996. Skaters competed in three disciplines: men's singles, ladies' singles, and pair skating. The competition is named for 1972 Olympic gold medalist Ondrej Nepela.

Results

Men

Ladies

Pairs

External links
 4th Ondrej Nepela Memorial

Ondrej Nepela Memorial, 1996
Ondrej Nepela Memorial
Ondrej Nepela Memorial, 1996